Selwyn Charles (born 30 May 1936) is a Trinidadian cricketer. He played in three first-class matches for Trinidad and Tobago in 1958/59 and 1959/60.

See also
 List of Trinidadian representative cricketers

References

External links
 

1936 births
Living people
Trinidad and Tobago cricketers